Angela "Angel" Ridgeon is a British actress best known for her role as Trisha Watson on the fifth season of Footballers' Wives.

Filmography
Footballers' Wives as Trisha Watson (2006)
Footballers' Wives: Extra Time as Trisha Watson (1 episode, 2006)
William and Mary as Woman with Baby (1 episode, 2005)
Life Begins as Mrs. Murray (1 episode, 2004)
The Bill as Emma Hooper / ... (3 episodes, 1999–2004)
Wall of Silence (2004) (TV) (as Angela Ridgedon)
My Family as Nursery Nurse (1 episode, 2003)
Murder in Mind as Michelle Croft (1 episode, 2002)
Holby City as Danielle (1 episode, 2001), Holby City Extra Time (2001) as Danielle
Martian Gothic: Unification (2000) (VG) (voice) (as Angel Ridgeon)
Call Red as Lianne (1 episode, 1996)

References

External links
 

Living people
British actresses
Year of birth missing (living people)
Place of birth missing (living people)